Dorothy Walker is a British journalist and author.

She has contributed to The Times, The Sunday Times, The Independent, The Guardian, The Daily Telegraph , The Evening Standard, The Scotsman and The Mail on Sunday and has been a regular columnist for the Times Educational Supplement. She wrote a regular column on science and technology for Saga Magazine.

She was voted National Newspaper Technology Journalist of the Year in the BT Technology Awards 1997–98.

Walker is author of Education in the Digital Age, a front-line report on the impact of information technology (IT) in education. She is a member of The Society of Authors.

She was educated at the Institute of Archaeology, University of London, where she gained a degree in archaeology. Her early career was in financial software in the City of London.

Walker is married to journalist Willy Newlands, former travel editor of the Daily Mail.

Walker was first runner-up to Miss United Kingdom in 1977.

Books
Walker, Dorothy. Education in the Digital Age, Bowerdean (1998).

References

External links 
Dorothy Walker’s website, Write a Better Bid with Dorothy Walker

British journalists
Alumni of the UCL Institute of Archaeology
Alumni of the University of London
Living people
Year of birth missing (living people)